Cysteine protease ATG4B is an enzyme that in humans is encoded by the ATG4B gene.

Function 

Autophagy is the process by which endogenous proteins and damaged organelles are destroyed intracellularly. Autophagy is postulated to be essential for cell homeostasis and cell remodeling during differentiation, metamorphosis, non-apoptotic cell death, and aging. Reduced levels of autophagy have been described in some malignant tumors, and a role for autophagy in controlling the unregulated cell growth linked to cancer has been proposed. This gene encodes a member of the autophagin protein family. The encoded protein is also designated as a member of the C-54 family of cysteine proteases. Alternate transcriptional splice variants, encoding different isoforms, have been characterized.
One main function of Atg4 is to cleave the pre-protein of Atg8, leading to the non-lipidated soluble (-I) form which can be processed further by Atg3, Atg7, Atg5-12 into the lipidated form (-II) anchored to the autophagic membrane.

Interactions 

ATG4B has been shown to interact with GABARAPL2.

References

External links

Further reading